The historian of the United States Senate heads the United States Senate Historical Office, which was created in 1975 to record and preserve historical information about the United States Senate. The current historian of the Senate is Betty K. Koed.

Purpose
Serving as the Senate's institutional memory, the Historical Office collects and provides information on important events, precedents, dates, statistics, and historical comparisons of current and past Senate activities for use by members and staff, the media, scholars, and the general public. The office advises senators and committees on cost-effective disposition of their non-current office files, assists researchers seeking access to Senate records, and maintains automated information databases detailing locations of former members' papers.

It conducts oral history interviews with retired senior Senate staff and keeps extensive biographical and bibliographical information on former senators. Many of these interviews are available on the Senate website.  A collection of more than thirty thousand Senate-related photographs and other illustrations is available for research and publication use. The Historical Office and its staff has also produced numerous publications through the years, covering all aspects of Senate history.

List of Senate historians
 Richard A. Baker 1975–2009
 Donald A. Ritchie 2009–2015
 Betty K. Koed 2015–present

External links
https://www.senate.gov/pagelayout/reference/a_three_sections_with_teasers/biblio.htm
https://www.senate.gov/artandhistory/history/common/generic/Senate_Historical_Office.htm

1975 establishments in Washington, D.C.
Employees of the United States Senate
Historians of the United States Congress
Historians of the United States
Historians of the United States Senate